Kadıköy Rugby was founded by the joint efforts of a group of fellow students from Uskudar Anadolu Lisesi and ex-İstanbul Ottomans rugby player Mert Ataray in early 2006. The establishment of the team quickly drew attention of the lively, hot blooded youth of Kadıköy district and soon settled itself as the future of Turkish rugby. Kadıköy is well known to be symbolized with its bull icon standing in the district square, which was more than suitable to identify the spirit of the team, and the asperity of the rugby sport itself, and quickly became an inspiration to the club's emblem and nickname.

Right after being established, the club registered itself to the Turkish Federation of Rugby, Baseball, Softball and American Football to become the first official rugby club in Turkey.

Today, Kadıköy Rugby is one of the power house in Turkish Rugby. After reaching the final in 2014 and winning the Istanbul 7s tournament, Kadıköy Rugby will be looking to win this season league, launch a Women s team and will be looking to start a Youth section for the season 2015/2016. the primary goal of the club is to encourage rugby nationwide by their campaign to help the founding of new rugby clubs, setting up a national league and to make ground for Turkey national rugby union team as soon as possible.

First squad (2006)

Related links
Kadıköy Rugby Official Website
Kadıköy Rugby Official Mail Group
Kadıköy Rugby Official Forums
Turkish Federation of Baseball, Softball, Rugby and American Football

Turkish rugby union teams
Sport in Kadıköy
Rugby clubs established in 2006
2006 establishments in Turkey